Well-known people who have been diagnosed with Bell's palsy include:

 Roseanne Barr, American comedian and actress whose condition occurred as a child
 Stevie Benton, bassist for Texas rock band Drowning Pool
 Hafþór Júlíus Björnsson, Icelandic professional strongman, actor, and professional basketball player
 Amy Brenneman, American actress and producer
 Pierce Brosnan, Irish actor, film producer and environmentalist
 Jean Chrétien, prime minister of Canada
 George Clooney, American actor, director, producer, and screenwriter
 Norm Coleman, United States Senator
 Alexis Denisof, American actor
 Glen Durrant, BDO World Darts Champion
 Thomas C. Foley, American politician and businessman; U.S. Ambassador to Ireland
 David Frum, Canadian-American pundit
 Graeme Garden, British comedy writer and performer, who has written about his experiences with the condition
 Allen Ginsberg, American beat poet
 Tony Gonzalez, American NFL football player
 Amy Goodman, American journalist and author
 Jane Greer, American actress
 Trenton Hassell, American basketball player for the New Jersey Nets of the NBA
 Terrence Howard, American actor
 Armando Iannucci, Scottish writer
 Angelina Jolie, American actress and filmmaker
 Anupam Kher, Indian actor
 Ralph Kiner, American baseball player in the 1940s and 1950s
 Ella Koon, Tahitian-born Hong Kong singer-actress
 Curtis LeMay, United States Air Force general and 1968 independent vice presidential candidate
 Gordon Lightfoot, Canadian singer
 Martin Love, Australian cricketer
 Joe Mantegna, American actor
 Pete Maravich, American basketball player
 Florence Mars, American civil rights activist and author
 Tom McCarthy, Canadian National Hockey League player who played for the Minnesota North Stars and Boston Bruins
 Glenda McKay, British actress
 Danny Meyer, American restaurateur in New York City; chief executive officer of Union Square Hospitality Group
 Scarlett Moffatt, British television personality
 Kim Mulkey, American basketball player and coach (Baylor University women)
 Ralph Nader, American politician
 Piper Niven, Scottish professional wrestler
 Cliff Pennington, shortstop for the Oakland Athletics
 Demond Price (Conway The Machine), musician and member of rap group Griselda.
 Jim Ross, professional wrestling commentator for WWE, WCW, NJPW, and AEW
 Rick Savage, bass guitarist for the British rock band Def Leppard
 Tom Seaver, Hall of Fame Major League pitcher
 Bernadette Sembrano, Filipino newscaster, host of the medical program Salamat Dok! and anchor of TV Patrol Weekend
 Ayrton Senna, Brazilian Formula One racecar driver
 Rahul Sharma, Indian cricketer
 Jamey Sheridan, American actor whose condition was written into the show Law and Order: Criminal Intent
 Sarah Smart, English actress
 Mike South, American pornographic director
 Bruce Sutter, American Major League Baseball pitcher
 Eric Swalwell, American politician and currently serving as the U.S. representative for California's 15th congressional district 
 Bart Tommelein, Belgian politician
 Kevin Tsai, Taiwanese writer and TV host
 Colin Turkington, British touring car racing driver
 Evan Turner, American basketball player
 Chris Walker, British superbike racer
 Wesley Walker, American football player was unable to blink his left eye due to Bell's palsy in 1982, but played football anyway
 Andrew Lloyd Webber, British composer
 Joseph C. Wilson, American diplomat
 Nancy Zieman, American television host of the show Sewing with Nancy

References

Lists of people by medical condition